Altieri is an Italian surname. It may refer to:

Altieri family, a noble Italian family from Rome, whose most notable exponent was Pope Clement X (r. 1670-1676);

Persons
Notable people with the surname include:

Angelo Altieri (died 1472), Italian Roman Catholic Bishop of Nepi e Sutri 
Giambattista Altieri (1589–1654), Italian Roman Catholic cardinal
Vincenzo Maria Altieri (1724–1800), Italian Roman Catholic cardinal

Carlos Delgado Altieri (born 1960), Puerto Rican politician
Charles Altieri, American academic
Dario Altieri, American researcher, director of The Wistar Institute Cancer Center in Philadelphia
Elena Altieri (1910–1997), Italian actress
Erik Altieri, the executive director of the National Organization for the Reform of Marijuana Laws (NORML
John Altieri (1969–2008), American singer and actor
Kevin Altieri, American television director
Lodovico Altieri (1805–1867), Italian Roman Catholic cardinal
Luis Altieri (born 1962), Argentine visual artist and yogi
María Meléndez Altieri (born 1950), current mayor of the city of Ponce, Puerto Rico
Maria Luisa Altieri Biagi (1930–2017), Italian scholar and writer
Michel Altieri (born 1978), Italian singer and actor
Miguel Altieri, American academic
Mitchell Altieri, American film director
Willie "Two-Knife" Altieri (1891–1970), American mobster

See also
Cesar Altieri Sayoc Jr., an alleged attempted U.S. serial mail bomber
Palazzo Altieri, palace in Rome

Italian-language surnames